The Battle of Oenophyta took place between Athens and the Boeotian city-states in 457 BC during the First Peloponnesian War.

In this period between the Persian Wars and the Peloponnesian War, alliances and leagues sprang up and collapsed, although there was very little prolonged warfare. In 457 Athens, the leader of the Delian League, came into conflict with Corinth and their ally Sparta (leader of the Peloponnesian League) over Megara; two months prior to the Battle of Oenophyta, the Athenians were defeated at the Battle of Tanagra by Sparta, but Sparta had lost so many men that they could not take advantage of their victory. 

The Athenians, who had 14,000 men at Tanagra, regrouped after that battle and marched into Boeotia. At Oenophyta, led by Myronides they defeated the Boeotians, and then destroyed the walls of Tanagra and ravaged Locrida and Phocis. Their victory at Oenophyta allowed Athens to defeat Aegina later in the year, and to finish the construction of the Long Walls to the Athenian port of Piraeus (an action opposed by Sparta). 

Athens remained in control of Boeotia until 447 BC, when they were defeated at the Battle of Coronea.

457 BC
450s BC conflicts
Oenophyta
Oenophyta 457 BC
Oenophyta 457 BC
Ancient Boeotia